The 2010 Brands Hatch Formula Two round was the sixth round of the 2010 FIA Formula Two Championship season. It will be held on July 17, 2010 and July 18, 2010 at Brands Hatch, Kent, England. This was the first race at Brands Hatch after the death of Henry Surtees the previous year.

Classification

Qualifying

Race 1

Race 2

References

FIA Formula Two Championship